The 2014 Kent State Golden Flashes football team represented Kent State University in the 2014 NCAA Division I FBS football season. They were led by second-year head coach Paul Haynes and played their home games at Dix Stadium as a member of the East Division of the Mid-American Conference. They finished the season 2–9, 1–6 in MAC play to finish in last place in the East Division. They only played 11 games due to their November 19 game vs Buffalo being canceled due to inclement weather.

Schedule

Schedule source:

Hours before kickoff on November 19 against Buffalo, the officials postponed the game due to the inclement weather that dropped four feet of lake effect snow in the Buffalo, New York region. Game officials had soon reschedule the match up two days later at a new time, 1:00 p.m. Later it was announced that the two schools cancelled the game and would not reschedule.

References

Kent State
Kent State Golden Flashes football seasons
Kent State Golden Flashes football